Wien is an unincorporated community in northeast Chariton County, in the U.S. state of Missouri. The community is on Missouri Route 129 approximately 16 miles north of Salisbury.

History
Wien was platted in 1877, and named after Vienna (German: Wien), the capital of Austria.  A post office called Wien was established in 1873, and remained in operation until 1903.

References

Unincorporated communities in Chariton County, Missouri
Unincorporated communities in Missouri